Novaya Zemlya (also , ;) is an archipelago in northern Russia. It is situated in the Arctic Ocean, in the extreme northeast of Europe, with Cape Flissingsky, on the northern island, considered the easternmost point of Europe. To Novaya Zemlya's west lies the Barents Sea and to the east is the Kara Sea.

Novaya Zemlya consists of two main islands, the northern Severny Island and the southern Yuzhny Island, which are separated by the Matochkin Strait. Administratively, it is incorporated as Novaya Zemlya District, one of the twenty-one in Arkhangelsk Oblast, Russia. Municipally, it is incorporated as Novaya Zemlya Urban Okrug.

The population of Novaya Zemlya as of the 2010 Census was about 2,429, of whom 1,972 resided in Belushya Guba, an urban settlement that is the administrative center of Novaya Zemlya District. 
The indigenous population (from 1872 to the 1950s when it was resettled to the mainland) consisted of about 50–300 Nenets who subsisted mainly on fishing, trapping, reindeer herding, polar bear hunting and seal hunting. Natural resources include copper, lead, and zinc.

Novaya Zemlya was a sensitive military area during the Cold War, and parts of it are still used for airfields today. The Soviet Air Force maintained a presence at Rogachevo on the southern part of the southern island, on the westernmost peninsula. It was used primarily for interceptor aircraft operations, but also provided logistical support for the nearby nuclear test area. Novaya Zemlya was one of the two major nuclear test sites managed by the USSR; it was used for air drops and underground testing of the largest of Soviet nuclear bombs, in particular the October 30, 1961 air burst explosion of Tsar Bomba, the largest, most powerful nuclear weapon ever detonated.

History
The Russian people knew of Novaya Zemlya from the 11th century, when hunters from Novgorod visited the area. For Western Europeans, the search for the Northern Sea Route in the 16th century led to its exploration. The first visit from a Western European was by Hugh Willoughby in 1553. Dutch explorer Willem Barentsz reached the west coast of Novaya Zemlya in 1594, and in a subsequent expedition of 1596, he rounded the northern cape and wintered on the northeastern coast. (Barentsz died during the expedition, and may have been buried on Severny Island.) During a later voyage by Fyodor Litke in 1821–1824, the western coast was mapped. Henry Hudson was another explorer who passed through Novaya Zemlya while searching for the Northeast Passage.

The islands were systematically surveyed by Pyotr Pakhtusov and Avgust Tsivolko during the early 1830s. The first permanent settlement was established in 1870 at Malye Karmakuly, which served as capital of Novaya Zemlya until 1924. Later, the administrative center was transferred to Belushya Guba, in 1935 to Lagernoe, but then returned to Belushya Guba.

Small numbers of Nenets were resettled to Novaya Zemlya in the 1870s in a bid by Russia to keep out the Norwegians. This population, then numbering 298, was transferred to the mainland in 1957 before nuclear testing began.

World War II 

In the months following Hitler's June 1941 invasion of the Soviet Union, the United States and Great Britain organized convoys of merchant ships under naval escort to deliver Lend-Lease supplies to northern Soviet seaports. The Allied convoys up to PQ 12 arrived unscathed but German aircraft, ships and U-boats were sent to northern Norway and Finland to oppose the convoys.

Convoy PQ 17 
The convoy departed Iceland on June 27, 1942, one ship running aground and dropping out of the convoy. The convoy was able to sail north of Bear Island but encountered ice floes on June 30; a ship was damaged too badly to carry on and broke radio silence. On the following morning, the convoy was detected by German U-boats and German reconnaissance aircraft and torpedo bomber attacks began on July 2.

On the night of July 2/3, the German battleship Tirpitz and the heavy cruiser Admiral Hipper, sortied from Trondheim with four destroyers and two smaller vessels. The pocket battleships Admiral Scheer and Lutzow and six destroyers sailed from Narvik, but Lutzow and three destroyers ran aground. The British Admiralty responded on July 4 by diverting the escort vessels to the west to rendezvous with the Home Fleet and ordered the merchant vessels to scatter. Seeking safety in the Matochkin Strait, several ships headed toward Novaya Zemlya. S.A. Kerslake, a crew-member aboard the British trawler Northern Gem, recorded in his diary:

When the Northern Gem approached Novaya Zemlya and neared the entrance to Matochkin Strait, it quickly reduced speed. Kerslake wrote:

Another seaman described the strait as "very barren and uninviting, but almost with 'Welcome' written along it."

On July 7 at 4:00 p.m., Captain J. H. Jauncey, the commander of the British anti-aircraft ship Palomares, called a meeting of the commanders of the other ships which had reached the strait. At first, they discussed breaking into the Kara Sea from the east end of the Strait. An officer familiar with the region raised the possibility that the strait, navigable on the west end, might, at the other end, be ice-locked. A seaplane was dispatched which found that the eastern entrance was blocked. Other officers suggested that the ships remain in the strait until "the hue and cry had died down", adding that "the high cliffs on either side would afford some protection from dive-bombing".

The ships were painted white and positioned with its armament facing the west entrance. The French corvettes Lotus and La Malouine were dispatched to patrol the entrance to watch for German submarines.

At 7:00 p.m., the ships re-entered the Barents Sea and headed south. Anticipating the breakout, Rear Admiral Hubert Schmundt had positioned several U-boats near the west end of the strait. Six of the seventeen Allied ships exiting the strait were sunk. The badly-damaged American freighter Alcoa Ranger was beached on the west coast of Novaya Zemlya; the crew found shelter and were eventually rescued by a Russian vessel which took them to Belushya Bay. The Germans also damaged the Soviet tankers Donbass and Azerbaijan which reached the sanctuary of Archangel. Of the thirty-four merchant ships in PQ 17, twenty-four were sunk. The American contingent alone lost more than three-fourths of the merchant ships committed to the convoy — more than one fourth of the losses to American shipping in all convoys to northern Russia.

Karlo Štajner, a Gulag prisoner in Norilsk in 1942, wrote "the German cruiser’s attack on Novaya Zemlya and the sinking of the food transports had catastrophic consequences… the population was left without provisions… supplies in the warehouses of Norilsk [were] distributed among the NKVD, the guards, and the few free civilians that lived in the town". Štajner and his fellow prisoners received nothing. Between July and August 1942, German U-boats destroyed the Maliyye Karmakuly polar station and damaged the station at Mys Zhelaniya. German warships also destroyed two Soviet seaplanes and staged an attack on ships in Belushya Bay.

Operation Wunderland 
In August 1942, the German Navy commenced Operation Wunderland, to enter the Kara Sea and sink as many Soviet ships as possible. Admiral Scheer and other warships rounded Cape Desire, entered the Kara Sea and attacked a shore station on Dikson Island, badly damaging the Soviet ships Dezhnev and Revolutionist. Later that year, Karlo Štajner made the acquaintance of a new prisoner, a Captain Menshikov, who told him that:

Whether the attack on Menshikov's battery occurred on Dikson Island or on Novaya Zemlya, Stajner's account illuminated the fate of a Soviet officer imprisoned by his countrymen for the "crime" of suffering defeat at the hands of the enemy. Not surprisingly, Menshikov's arrest was never announced in the Soviet press.

1943 operations
In August 1943, a German U-boat sank the Soviet research ship Akademic Shokalskiy near Mys Sporyy Navolok but the Soviet Navy, now on the offensive, destroyed the German submarine U-639 near Mys Zhelaniya.

In 1943, Novaya Zemlya briefly served as a secret seaplane base for Nazi Germany's Kriegsmarine, to provide German surveillance of Allied shipping en route to Siberia. The seaplane base was established by U-255 and U-711, which were operating along the northern coast of Soviet Russia as part of 13th U-boat Flotilla. Seaplane sorties were flown in August and September 1943.

Nuclear testing

In July 1954, Novaya Zemlya was designated as the nuclear weapons testing venue, construction of which began in October and existed during much of the Cold War. "Zone A", Chyornaya Guba, was used in 1955–1962 and 1972–1975.  "Zone B", Matochkin Shar, was used for underground tests in 1964–1990.  "Zone C", Sukhoy Nos, was used in 1958–1961 and was the site of the 1961 test of the Tsar Bomba, the most powerful nuclear weapon ever detonated.

Other tests occurred elsewhere throughout the islands, with an official testing range covering over half of the landmass. In September 1961, two propelled thermonuclear warheads were launched from Vorkuta Sovetsky and Salekhard to target areas on Novaya Zemlya. The launch rocket was subsequently deployed to Cuba.

1963 saw the implementation of the Limited Test Ban Treaty which banned most atmospheric nuclear tests. The largest underground test in Novaya Zemlya took place on September 12, 1973, involving four nuclear devices of 4.2 megatons total yield. Although far smaller in blast power than the Tsar Bomba and other atmospheric tests, the confinement of the blasts underground led to pressures rivaling natural earthquakes. In the case of the September 12, 1973 test, a seismic magnitude of 6.97 on the Richter Scale was reached, setting off an 80 million ton avalanche that blocked two glacial streams and created a lake  in length.

Over its history as a nuclear test site, Novaya Zemlya hosted 224 nuclear detonations with a total explosive energy equivalent to 265 megatons of TNT. For comparison, all explosives used in World War II, including the detonations of two US nuclear bombs, amounted to only two megatons.

In 1988–1989, glasnost helped make the Novaya Zemlya testing activities public knowledge, and in 1990 Greenpeace activists staged a protest at the site. The last nuclear test explosion was in 1990 (also the last for the entire Soviet Union and Russia). The Ministry for Atomic Energy has performed a series of subcritical underwater nuclear experiments near Matochkin Shar each autumn since 1998.

In October 2012, it was reported that Russia would resume subcritical nuclear testing at "Zone B".

Geography and geology

Novaya Zemlya is an extension of the northern part of the Ural Mountains, and the interior is mountainous throughout. It is separated from the mainland by the Kara Strait. Novaya Zemlya consists of two major islands, separated by the narrow Matochkin Strait, as well as a number of smaller islands. The two main islands are:

 Severny (Northern), which has a large ice cap, the Severny Island ice cap, as well as many active glaciers.
 Yuzhny (Southern), which is largely unglaciated and has a tundra landscape.

The coast of Novaya Zemlya is very indented, and it is the area with the largest number of fjords in the Russian Federation. Novaya Zemlya separates the Barents Sea from the Kara Sea. The highest mountain is located on the Northern island and is 1,547 meters (5,075 ft) high.

Compared to other regions that were under large ice sheets during the last glacial period, Novaya Zemlya shows relatively little isostatic rebound. Possibly this is indebted to a counter-effect created by the growth of glaciers during the last few thousand years.

Geology 
The geology of Novaya Zemlya is dominated by a large anticlinal structure that forms an extension of the Ural Mountains. The geology is primarily formed of Paleozoic sedimentary rocks, including both carbonate and siliciclastic rocks spanning the Cambrian to Permian, ranging from deep marine turbidites and flysch to shallow marine and terrestrial sandstones and reef limestones. Small areas of late Neoproterozoic (~600 mya) granite and associated metasedimentary rocks are also exposed.

Environment
The ecology of Novaya Zemlya is influenced by its severe climate, but the region nevertheless supports a diversity of biota. One of the most notable species present is the polar bear, whose population in the Barents Sea region is genetically distinct from other polar bear subpopulations.

Climate
Novaya Zemlya has a maritime-influenced variety of a tundra climate (Köppen ET). Due to some effect from the Gulf Stream and its offshore position, winters are a lot less severe than in inland areas on a lot lower latitudes in Siberia, but instead last up to eight months a year. The milder waters to its west delays the onset of sea ice and causes vast seasonal lag in shoulder seasons. Due to latitudinal differences, the temperatures and daylight varies quite a bit throughout the archipelago, with the Malye Karmakuly station being located in the southern part. Novaya Zemlya is cloudy in general, but snowfall and rainfall is relatively scarce for being a maritime location. Even so, glaciers dominate the northern interior and there is strong snow accumulation each winter due to the length of the season.

Polar bears enter human-inhabited areas more frequently than previously, which has been attributed to climate change. Global warming reduces sea ice, forcing the bears to come inland to find food. In February 2019, a mass migration occurred in the northeastern portion of Novaya Zemlya. Dozens of polar bears were seen entering homes, public buildings, and inhabited areas, so Arkhangelsk region authorities declared a state of emergency on Saturday, February 16, 2019.

In creative works
 Gerrit de Veer, Nova Zembla, written 1598, published 1996
 Gottfried Wilhelm Leibniz refers to Nova Zembla in the Preface to the New Essays on Human Understanding, saying that observations there establish that it is not always true that within the passage of twenty-four hours day turns into night and night into day.
 Vladimir Nabokov:
 "The Refrigerator Awakes" (1942), line 27
 In Pale Fire (1962), Kinbote's home country is named Zembla, and references to Novaya Zembla are made throughout the novel.
 In Ian Fleming's The Living Daylights (1966), Agent 272 is holed up in Novaya Zemlya.
 Clive Cussler's Raise the Titanic! (1976), features a U.S. plan to recover a rare element vital to protecting the U.S. in the Cold War, an element found on Novaya Zemlya (where a U.S. spy and a Soviet guard clash), but now believed to be in the wreck of the RMS Titanic.
 Thomas Carlyle, 1833, Sartor Resartus, Book II, Chapter Nine
 Laurence Sterne, 1761, The Life & Opinions of Tristram Shandy, Gentleman, Book III, Chapter Twenty
 Alexander Pope: 
 "The Dunciad" (1728), line 74: "Here gay description Egypt glads with showers,/Or gives to Zembla fruits, to Barca flowers..."
 "An Essay on Man" (1733-1734), epistle 2, part 5: "...But where the extreme of vice, was ne’er agreed:/Ask where’s the north? at York, ’tis on the Tweed;/In Scotland, at the Orcades; and there,/At Greenland, Zembla, or the Lord knows where."
 Thomas Köner – Novaya Zemlya, 2012 album on Touch Music
 Edward Gorey- The Broken Spoke Cycling cards from the pen of Dogear Wryde. One shows 3 contestants in the annual Trans-Novaya Zemlya Bicycle Race.
 The 1998 video game Delta Force featured several missions set on Novaya Zemlya.

See also

List of fjords of Russia
List of islands of Russia
Novaya Zemlya effect
Gusinaya Zemlya
Novaya Zemlya (2008 film)
Nova Zembla (2011 film)
Tsar Bomba
Gora Severny Nunatak
Mezhdusharsky Island

References

Notes

Sources

Further reading

External links

Novaya Zemlya information portal
Selected satellite views of nuclear test site Novaya Zemlya (global security).
Environment, climate change, and history of exploration (Barents' wintering).
Rozenberg Publishers – Climate and glacial history of the Novaya Zemlya Archipelago, Russian Arctic 
Nuclear tests in Novaya Zemlya, International Atomic Energy Agency Department of Nuclear Safety and Security.
 Испытание чистой водородной бомбы мощностью 50 млн тонн, declassified Rosatom historical video of the RDS-220, or Tsar Bomba, 50 megatonne hydrogen bomb test on 30 October 1961. at 8:55–9:30. 20 August 2020.

 
Archipelagoes of the Arctic Ocean
Archipelagoes of the Kara Sea
Islands of the Barents Sea
Archipelagoes of Arkhangelsk Oblast
Russian nuclear test sites